27 Rue de la Paix is a 1936 French crime film directed by Richard Pottier and starring Renée Saint-Cyr, Suzy Prim and Jules Berry.

Cast
 Renée Saint-Cyr as Gloria Grand  
 Suzy Prim as Jenny Clarens  
 Jules Berry as Denis Grand 
 Jean Galland as Maître Jean Bernard  
 Gaby Basset as Alice Perrin aka Jeanne Pinson  
 Junie Astor as Olly  
 Gabriel Signoret as Le procureur Montfort 
 Jean Wall as Furet  
 Julien Carette as Jules  
 Serjius 
  
 René Génin as Jules Fouillard  
 Georges Paulais 
 Philippe Richard as Police Official  
 Georges Péclet 
 Anthony Gildès as Montfort's Aide  
 Jacques Berlioz
 Al Brown

References

Bibliography 
 Alastair Phillips. Rififi: French Film Guide. I.B.Tauris, 2009.

External links 
 

1936 films
1936 crime films
French crime films
1930s French-language films
Films directed by Richard Pottier
French black-and-white films
1930s French films